Winston Attong (born 19 March 1947) is a former Trinidad cyclist. He competed in the sprint event at the 1972 Summer Olympics.

References

External links
 

1947 births
Living people
Trinidad and Tobago male cyclists
Olympic cyclists of Trinidad and Tobago
Cyclists at the 1972 Summer Olympics
Place of birth missing (living people)
Cyclists at the 1970 British Commonwealth Games
Commonwealth Games competitors for Trinidad and Tobago
20th-century Trinidad and Tobago people